"Baby, Baby" is a song by American duo Xtreme. It served as the second single for their fourth album, Chapter Dos: On the Verge (2009).

Charts

References

2009 songs
2009 singles
Xtreme (group) songs